Kory Merrill Tarpenning (born February 27, 1962 in Portland, Oregon) is a retired American pole vaulter best known for finishing fourth at the 1992 Summer Olympics in Barcelona, having previously competed at the 1988 Summer Olympics in Seoul.

Career 

Aside from his Olympic appearances, he came fourth at both the 1991 IAAF World Indoor Championships and 1994 IAAF Grand Prix Final. He also competed at the 1992 IAAF World Cup, but failed to register a valid mark. He was a four time national champion in his discipline, having won at the USA Outdoor Track and Field Championships in 1988 and 1989 and the USA Indoor Track and Field Championships in 1991 and 1994. He also came second at the 1994 Prefontaine Classic, losing out to Sergey Bubka. Tarpenning tested positive for anabolic steroid use in 1997 and was suspended for two years.

After his athletic career, he moved to Monaco and was involved in the opening of the first Starbucks coffee house in the country.

References

1962 births
Living people
American expatriate sportspeople in Monaco
American male pole vaulters
Doping cases in athletics
Athletes (track and field) at the 1988 Summer Olympics
Athletes (track and field) at the 1992 Summer Olympics
American sportspeople in doping cases
Olympic track and field athletes of the United States
Sheldon High School (Eugene, Oregon) alumni
Track and field athletes from Portland, Oregon